Richard Allan Caring (born 4 June 1948) is a British businessman. He initially built a business, International Clothing Designs, supplying Hong Kong-manufactured fashion to UK retailers. After surviving the 2004 Indian Ocean earthquake, he diversified his business interest into restaurants and nightclubs and is the chairman of Caprice Holdings, which owns and runs The Ivy chain of restaurants. 

According to the Sunday Times Rich List in 2021, Caring's net worth is estimated to be £1.005 billion.

Early life
Caring was born on 4 June 1948, the middle child of three born to Louis Caringi, an Italian-American GI, stationed in London during World War II, and Sylvia Parnes, a Jewish-immigrant nurse who met him in the ambulance on his way to hospital, and cared for him during his recovery.

After deciding to stay in London after the war, the couple married. Louis Caringi anglicized his surname to Caring, and set up in the clothing industry in offices off Great Portland Street; Louis Caring Originals sourced knitwear for retailers including Marks & Spencer.

Caring's prowess at golf, playing off of scratch, resulted in him representing Middlesex at county level, and being accepted into Millfield School in Street, Somerset on a 10-shilling-a-week sporting scholarship.

Career

Clothing
Caring left school aged 16 and joined a shopping centre development company as an office boy, before joining Louis Caring Originals, his father's dress manufacturing business that employed seven people:
At that time, the family was in financial difficulties, which threatened losing their home. Caring and his then girlfriend made a range of mini-skirts that cost £2 to make, selling them for 69s 6d (£3.475 in decimalisation). With an initial target of 200 a week, after a few years they were selling 25,000 a week:
In 1971 Caring first visited Hong Kong, where labour and materials were far cheaper than in Britain. Until this point, Hong Kong made basic clothing cheaply, such as underpants. Spending a year living out of a suitcase and resident in one hotel, Caring educated local manufacturers through producing the same garment over and over again to get the quality right. As a result, he became one of the first western high fashion buyers to develop localised Chinese relationships, and returned to the UK to sell the new high quality but cheaper garments to UK retailers.

Forming International Clothing Designs (ICD) to exploit the new opportunity, Caring moved his family permanently to Hong Kong in 1979. Due to its international trading nature, the company's structure and holdings are complex, held through a series of offshore companies and trusts, making it hard to detect Caring’s full earnings from the fashion world. The manoeuvre worked, and Caring cornered the market in fast fashion. ICD at its height supplied 70% of the clothing sold by British high street retailers, supplying Marks & Spencer, Mothercare and Next.

It was through ICD and its trading that he met and developed his relationship with Sir Philip Green. ICD was the dominant supplier to Arcadia Group, the then Green-owned fashion retail chain that included Dorothy Perkins, Topshop and Top Man. Arcadia Group went into administration in November 2020. This was not the normal retailer and supplier set-up but described as more of a partnership, with Caring presenting Green with a Ferrari F430 Spider for his 50th birthday:

For less than a year, Caring worked for Green. In 2001, Caring invested in Green's British Home Stores (BHS), owning 22.5% of the retailer and earning £100m in dividends, before disposing of his shares in 2006. Caring supplied Next plc via a joint venture company NV, but sold his share in the 1990s back to the retailer. He built a joint venture to supply Freemans catalogues, again now sold to the partner. He also co-developed the Together brand, which after buying out partners he sold to German catalogue firm Otto Versand. In 2004–05, ICD saw sales drop to £74.2m from £85.5m, making a pre-tax loss of £523,644 from a £3.99m profit the year before after an exceptional loss on the sale of Amanda Wakeley's designer label. In 2007, Caring looked at buying the distressed Prada brand.

In 2009, ICD employed 250 people and was a smaller operation in the UK than it had previously been.

Property
It is proposed by many that Caring first started investing in property while resident in Hong Kong, ploughing back profits from clothing sourcing into other assets. His first UK publicised deal was the £45m purchase of a part of the Camden Market complex in 2004, that he purchased from Bebo Kobo and OD Kobo.

Later that same year he bought Wentworth Golf Club in partnership with then minority shareholder, airport hotel entrepreneur Surinder Arora; they paid £130m, £50m more than the club’s book value at the time: He sold Wentworth in 2014 for £135m to Reignwood Investments, a Chinese holding company associated with billionaire Yan Bin.

Caring purchased the former US Navy building in London's Grosvenor Square in 2009.

Restaurants and private members' clubs
After buying Wentworth Golf Club, Caring wanted to improve the catering there and approached Le Caprice restaurant in summer 2005; during discussions it emerged that the management of Caprice Holdings group was looking for a buyer. Six weeks later, Caring secured a £31.5m deal to take over Caprice Holdings, owner of The Ivy, Le Caprice and J Sheekey, as well as Italian restaurant Daphne's, Vietnamese restaurant Bam-Bou and Moroccan restaurant Pasha.

Caring began to reshape the group, which created much media coverage for someone who previously preferred to stay out of the limelight. In 2005 he added fish restaurant Scott’s and catering firm Urban Productions, but sold Pasha to Algerian restaurateur Tony Kitous.  He also bought Signature Restaurants from Luke Johnson for £57m, owner of mid-market Strada and Belgo chains.

In 2006 he bought Rivington, a two-restaurant group independently set up by Caprice Holding’s chef director Mark Hix. He sold Strada in 2007 for £140m. In 2007 he purchased the Birley Group (Annabel's, Harry's Bar, Mark's Club) for £95m including the vast art collection, concluded just a few months before Mark Birley's death.

In 2008 he agreed a leveraged buyout of 28 small investors in private members' club Soho House, taking 80% for £105m, with the remainder held by Nick Jones who remains CEO, also his partner in Cecconi’s. Caring also owns stakes in Cote (formed by the former management team of Strada), and Alternative Investment Market listed chain Carluccio's.

Caprice Holdings also owns Sexy Fish.

The speed with which Caring has built his restaurant chain has resulted in many questioning his reasoning, on both a strategic level as well as the high purchase prices paid. He has been dubbed by some as "the Lex Luthor of Mayfair" for his apparent supermarket-sweep approach to buying companies.  Other critics say he is brandishing a credit card, playing a high-stakes game of Monopoly, buying every square he lands on.

But Caring insists he has a masterplan:

Caring's strategy is built around three brands, with 60,000 people:
Annabel's – including the Birley clubs (Mark's, Harry's Bar, George and Bath & Racquets), 12,000 members: He says "They're refined, discreet, elegant."
Soho House – 17,000 members: He says "They're for an arts, journalistic, younger crowd."
Caprice – 30,000 regular customers, the restaurant link between the two club chains

The brands have opened in several countries including: Le Caprice New York; Cecconi's Miami; Soho House, via £130m credit line supplied by HBoS, in Berlin, Chicago, Miami and Los Angeles.

Restaurant critic AA Gill once commented:
Caring owns restaurant chain The Ivy Collection.

Politics
A friend of Lord Levy, Caring lent £2m to the Labour Party to fund the 2005 United Kingdom general election. Caring was not later implicated or named as part of the Cash for Honours investigation. The loan monies have since been repaid.

Caring has donated to the Conservative Party on several occasions, mainly in the form of auction prizes. This includes the hire of Annabel’s in 2008 for the Conservative Party's Black and White Ball in Battersea Park, which was as an auction prize that raised £70,000.

He was also recorded as donating just over £50,000 to the party in 2010. In 2012 he was recorded as donating £170,000. This was followed by a £290,000 donation in the third quarter of 2015.

Philanthropy
After the 2004 Indian Ocean tsunami, Caring donated £1m to the relief effort. He supports the NSPCC at its Fresh Start centre in Camden, to combat child abuse and paedophilia. 

In 2005, he organised a charity costume "Napoleonic Ball" for the NSPCC in St Petersburg's Catherine Palace, Russia, featuring a performance by Sir Elton John. Caring spent £8m flying in 450 guests in by private jet, including Bob Geldof and former US president Bill Clinton, raising £11m. The Guardian has reported that Caring donated $1m to the Clinton Foundation.

Personal life
Caring married his first wife, Jacqueline Stead, in 1971. She is an Aldershot-born model and the daughter of a retired British Army major. They have two sons, who were raised in Hong Kong: Jamie, a vice-president of MTV Networks Europe; and Ben, who works for Soho House. 

The family lived in Hampstead, north London, in a house known as the Versailles of London. It has a  ballroom, a cinema, a dining room that seats 30; and a  garden with a lake. He has homes in Hong Kong, and owns the former stable block of Pixton Park, Dulverton, on the Somerset/Devon borders. Purchased in 2005, the Pixton building has an interior designed by Tara Bernerd, daughter of property developer Elliott Bernerd,

In 2016, Caring and Stead divorced in a high-profile case, which was described as "Britain's biggest divorce". He left his wife to move into a £32 million home in St John's Wood with 35-year-old Brazilian Patricia Mondinni, with whom he had a son. In March 2018, Caring married Mondinni. The couple also have two daughters.

His friends include Sir Philip Green and Scottish philanthropist Sir Tom Hunter.
His family relations include stockbroker Anthony Parnes and his son Michael Parnes, CEO of stock brokerage Old Park Lane Capital.

2004 Indian Ocean earthquake

In 2004 over the Christmas period, Caring and his sons were scuba diving in the Maldives. On Boxing Day, the dive-master suggested they sail to an atoll and dive nearby. On their return to the surface, Caring received calls from friends around the world asking: "Are you all right?"

Protected by the atoll, the divers had "felt a blip, but it could have been a big boat." Sir Philip Green sent his private jet to pick the family up, and Caring donated £1 million to the tsunami relief fund:

Controversy
In December 2014, Michelle Young accused Philip Green, Caring and Simon Cowell of helping her ex-husband, businessman Scot Young, to hide assets and so avoid paying maintenance to his ex-wife and their two daughters. In February 2015, a note from HSBC bankers in Caring's files mentioned that Philip Green's wife Tina Green had been holding part of Caring's assets in cash on his behalf, prompting suspicions that Caring might have funnelled profits through Tina Green to avoid paying taxes on his assets.

Following BHS's collapse into administration in 2016, leaving a pension fund deficit of £571m, it was reported that Caring had refused to reveal how much profit he had made from selling his shares in the company, and also refused to attend a parliamentary committee in person to give evidence.

References

1948 births
Living people
People from Finchley
People from Hampstead
English people of American descent
English people of Italian descent
English people of Polish-Jewish descent
People educated at Millfield
English businesspeople in fashion
English company founders
Businesspeople from London
20th-century British businesspeople
21st-century British businesspeople
British restaurateurs
Restaurant founders
Labour Party (UK) people
Conservative Party (UK) people
National Society for the Prevention of Cruelty to Children people